The 105th Independent Brigade of the Territorial Defense Forces is a military formation of the Territorial Defense Forces of Ukraine in Ternopil Oblast. It is part of Operational Command West.

History

Formation 
On 28 June 2018 in Ternopil Oblast Brigade was formed. On 2 August in Borshchiv, over 200 reservists were gathered for training. In November a recruitment drive was organized to fill Brigade ranks. In February and March 2019 Brigade held readiness exercises.

Russo-Ukrainian War

2022 Russian invasion of Ukraine
On 4 March governor of Ternopil Oblast Volodymyr Trush announced that Brigade was at its full strength. Soldiers from Brigade were tasked with defense of critical infrastructure, manning roadblocks and helping Postal workers deliver pensions. In August, units of Brigade were deployed and fought in the East.

Structure 
As of 2022 the brigade's structure is as follows:
 Headquarters
 80th Territorial Defense Battalion (Bilobozhnytsia) А7167
 82nd Territorial Defense Battalion (Zboriv) А7169
 83rd Territorial Defense Battalion (Ternopil) А7170
 85th Territorial Defense Battalion (Kremenets) А7172
 Counter-Sabotage Company
 Engineering Company
 Communication Company
 Logistics Company
 Mortar Battery

Commanders 
 Colonel Didichenko Oleh 2018 - 2019
 Colonel Fomenko Evhen 10 October 2022 - present

See also 
 Territorial Defense Forces of the Armed Forces of Ukraine

References 

Territorial defense Brigades of Ukraine
2018 establishments in Ukraine
Military units and formations established in 2018